Keith Sterling Nord (March 3, 1957 – September 19, 2018) was an American football defensive back in the National Football League (NFL). He played for the Minnesota Vikings from 1979 to 1985. He played college football at St. Cloud State University. He died of cancer on 19 September 2018.

References

External links
Official website

1957 births
2018 deaths
Players of American football from Minneapolis
American football defensive backs
St. Cloud State Huskies football players
Minnesota Vikings players
Ed Block Courage Award recipients